The Breithorn is a mountain of the Swiss Lepontine Alps in the Valais. It is part of the municipality Grengiols and overlooks the lower Goms on the north side and the Saflischtal on the south side, east of the Bättlihorn.

References

External links
 Breithorn on Hikr

Mountains of the Alps
Mountains of Switzerland
Mountains of Valais
Lepontine Alps
Two-thousanders of Switzerland